Lorraine de Selle is an Italian-born former actress noted for her work in Italian genre cinema during the 1970s and 1980s. 

Having worked with directors such as Joe D'Amato, Fernando di Leo, Ruggero Deodato and Umberto Lenzi, she remains best known for her roles in the horror films The House on the Edge of the Park and Cannibal Ferox, co-starring with Giovanni Lombardo Radice in both.

After retiring from acting, de Selle became a producer, responsible for the Italian TV series Carabinieri from 2002 to 2008.

Selected filmography

 Emanuelle in America (1977) - Gemini
 Il ginecologo della mutua (1977) - Mara's lover
 Women's Camp 119 (1977) - Maria Black
 Damned in Venice (1978) - Christine's friend
 Where Are You Going on Holiday? (1978) - Girl at telephone
 Lovers and Liars (1979) - Jennifer
 Gardenia (1979) - Consuelo
 A Woman in the Night (1979) - Bianca Maria
 How to Seduce Your Teacher (1979) - Fedora
 The New Godfathers (1979) - Lorraine
 Madness (1980) - Paola
 The House on the Edge of the Park (1980) - Gloria
 Cannibal Ferox (1981) - Gloria Davis
 Violence in a Women's Prison (1982) - Head Warden
 Women's Prison Massacre (1983) - Colleen
 Wild Beasts (1984) - Laura Schwarz

References

External links

Living people
French film actresses
Actresses from Milan
1951 births